Dusk is an unincorporated community in Gilmer County, West Virginia, United States. The community was once served by a post office, though the location has since closed.

References

Unincorporated communities in Gilmer County, West Virginia
Unincorporated communities in West Virginia